Goniatites bohemicus is a species of extinct cephalopods belonging to the family Goniatitidae, included in the superfamily Goniatitaceae.

These slow-moving nektonic carnivores lived in the Mississippian epoch during the Carboniferous period in what is now Bohemia.

References

Goniatitidae
Mississippian ammonites
Carboniferous ammonites of Europe